Seducing Maarya is a 2000 Canadian English drama film directed by Hunt Hoe with Nandana Sen, Cas Anvar, Vijay Metha, Ryan Hollyman and Mohan Agashe playing the lead roles.

The film won best director award at the Newport Beach International Film Festival in 2000.

Plot 
Vijay Chatterjee, a lonely widower is a successful restaurateur in Montreal. He hires Maarya, who recently emigrated from Calcutta, to work in his restaurant. Considering her to be an apt girl for her son Aashish, he gets her to marry him. Thoroughly Westernized Aashish, it turns out is a homosexual. But she plays along, keeping the secret from the elder Chatterjee, so that she can remain in the country. As he realizes the newly married couple are not behaving like one, he decides to teach his son the art of seducing a woman, oblivious to his orientation. He ends up falling in love with her himself. As she is eventually involved with her benefactor and now father-in-law, things get more complicated when Zakir, her jealous knife-wielding brother (and her lover in India), enters their lives and Maarya is found to be pregnant.

Cast 
Nandana Sen as Maarya 
Mohan Agashe as Vijay Chatterjee
Cas Anvar as Zakir 
Vijay Mehta as Ashish Chatterjee 
Ryan Hollyman as Michel 
Abhishekananda Singh Birla as Babu 
Cecile Cristobal as June Moon
Hunt Hoe as Albert Woo 
Xavier Georges as Spike 
Todd Moxness as Skip - Band 
Kanika Kapoor 
Paraish Misra as Young Zakir 
Mary Wong as Mother / Baby - Park 
Chloe Wong-Mersereau as Mother / Baby - Park 
Veena Sharma as Young Maarya

References

External links

Seducing Maarya

2000 films
Films about immigration
Films about women in the Indian diaspora
Canadian drama films
Films about Indian Canadians
Canadian LGBT-related films
2000 LGBT-related films
LGBT-related drama films
2000 drama films
2000s English-language films
2000s Canadian films